Viliame Titoko Gadolo  (born May 1, 1977 in Suva) is a Fijian rugby union player. He plays as a hooker.

Career
He played for the Suva side in the Digicel Cup since 1999 although he spent one year with Nadroga. By profession, he is a teacher and he teaches at Yat Sen Secondary School. He was a member of the Fiji U21 team that beat Australia U19s in 1999. He made his Test debut in May 2000 against Japan. Gadolo toured with the Fiji A team to Queensland in June 2002, then played against Tonga the following month when Isaia Rasila and Greg Smith were injured. He also captained the Suva provincial side to the semi-finals of the 2004 Digicel Cup. He plays for Suva Highlanders in the Colonial Cup. He was part of the Fiji team at the 2003 Rugby World Cup and 2007 Rugby World Cup.

He won the German rugby union championship in 2008, when playing for SC 1880 Frankfurt, winning the clubs first national championship since 1925.

References

External links
Fiji profile
Scrum profile

1977 births
Living people
Sportspeople from Suva
Fijian rugby union players
Rugby union hookers
SC 1880 Frankfurt players
Expatriate rugby union players in Germany
Fiji international rugby union players
Fijian expatriate rugby union players
Fijian expatriate sportspeople in Germany
I-Taukei Fijian people